Gianni Bismark Guigou Martínez (born 22 February 1975 in Nueva Palmira) is a Uruguayan former footballer who played as a midfielder.

Career
He started his career in Nacional, where he played from 1994 to 2000, winning the Uruguayan league titles of 1998 and 2000. He left Nacional to join Serie A club A.S. Roma in 2000 for US$5.8M, where he won the 2000/2001 Scudetto. Guigou left for Siena on loan in summer 2003 and sold to Fiorentina in July 2004 for a nominal fee of €516. In June 2006 he left for newly relegated Serie B side Treviso as part of Massimo Gobbi and Reginaldo's deal.

After the club was excluded from professional football in 2009, he was released for free by the federation and later joined Nacional, back in Uruguay. He played for Uruguay in the 2002 FIFA World Cup.

He also has Italian citizenship.

Honours

Club

Roma
 Serie A: 2000–01
 Supercoppa Italiana: 2001

International
Uruguay
 Copa América Runner-up: 1999

References

External links
 Profile

1975 births
Living people
Uruguayan footballers
Uruguay international footballers
Club Nacional de Football players
A.S. Roma players
A.C.N. Siena 1904 players
ACF Fiorentina players
Treviso F.B.C. 1993 players
Uruguayan Primera División players
Serie A players
Serie B players
Uruguayan people of Italian descent
2002 FIFA World Cup players
1999 Copa América players
Expatriate footballers in Italy
Uruguayan expatriate footballers
Uruguayan expatriate sportspeople in Italy
Association football midfielders